Eilema lutescens is a moth of the  subfamily Arctiinae. It is found on Sula.

References

 Natural History Museum Lepidoptera generic names catalog

lutescens
Moths described in 1912